Carlos Agustín Mármol (born October 14, 1982) is a Dominican former professional baseball relief pitcher. He played in Major League Baseball (MLB) for the Chicago Cubs, Los Angeles Dodgers, and the Miami Marlins.
Carlos owns Recta 49, a successful restaurant/car wash in the Dominican Republic.

Professional career

Minor leagues
Mármol was signed by the Chicago Cubs as an amateur free agent on July 3, 1999, as a catcher/outfielder. In his last season as a hitter, in 2002, he batted .258 with a .271 OBP for the Arizona League Cubs in the Rookie League, and .149 with a .167 OBP for the Lansing Lugnuts in the Midwest League.

After batting .273 in 14 minor league games, Mármol converted to become a pitcher. He went 26–19 with a 3.41 ERA before being added to the 40-man roster in November 2005.

Chicago Cubs

2006
Mármol made his Major League debut on June 4, 2006, against the St. Louis Cardinals in a relief appearance. He pitched two scoreless innings and gave up one hit while striking out three.

After Cubs pitcher Kerry Wood was placed on the disabled list for the second time of the season, Mármol was called on to make a spot start. He was one of seven rookies to make a start for the 2006 Cubs. On June 11, against the Cincinnati Reds, in his first Major League start he allowed just one run on two hits while striking out seven, to earn the win.

He went on to make 19 appearances and 13 starts in the 2006 season with a 5–7 record. He posted a 6.08 ERA in 77 innings, and walked 6.9 batters per 9 innings.

2007
Mármol returned to the Major Leagues in 2007 as a relief pitcher for the Cubs. Due to an injury to closer Ryan Dempster, Mármol was called upon to pitch in the ninth inning of a game against the Colorado Rockies on June 27, 2007. He pitched a scoreless frame, recording two strikeouts, for his first Major League save.

In his second season, he flourished in the bullpen as a setup man and finished the season with a stellar ERA of 1.43 and struck out 96 batters in 69.1 innings. His ERA was good enough for third in the Major Leagues among relievers, behind only Seattle Mariners closer J. J. Putz and Los Angeles Dodgers closer Takashi Saito. He received one 10th place vote and came in 26th in the MVP award voting.

2008
Entering the 2008 season, Mármol was in a tight battle for the closer spot that was now vacant with former closer Dempster having moved to the starting rotation. He competed with Kerry Wood and Bob Howry for the spot, and while both he and Wood had solid numbers in the spring, manager Lou Piniella opted for the veteran Wood to close and kept Mármol in the setup role he excelled at in 2007. With Wood suffering from a blister, Mármol was selected to replace him at the All-Star Game, and pitched a scoreless 13th inning of relief in an eventual 15-inning National League loss.

2009
Mármol competed with Kevin Gregg for the closer's role in 2009 after the departure of  Wood before the 2009 MLB season, but lost the role to Gregg.

In spring training in 2009 he led all pitchers in hit batsmen, with 5 (in 10.1 innings). As of August 18, 2009, he was leading all NL pitchers in hbp in the regular season, with 11 (in 56.1 innings), and his 52 walks averaged over 8 walks per 9 innings.

However, after a series of disappointing appearances by Gregg in August, and after Gregg allowed 12 homers in  innings (the most in the majors for a reliever), Piniella announced on August 18 that Mármol would replace Gregg as closer.

2010
Mármol won the Delivery Man of the Month Award for September 2010.
He finished the 2010 campaign with 16.0 strikeouts averaged per nine innings (138 in  innings), breaking the record for highest K/9 ratio by a pitcher with at least 50 innings pitched, previously held by  Éric Gagné's 14.9 mark over his 2003 season.  His 138 K's are a franchise record for a relief pitcher.

2011
In 2011, Mármol led the National League and tied for the Major League lead in blown saves (with Jordan Walden) with 10.

2013
On June 25, 2013, Marmol was designated for assignment by the Cubs after recording a 5.86 ERA in 31 appearances during the season.

Los Angeles Dodgers
On July 2, 2013, he was traded to the Los Angeles Dodgers for reliever Matt Guerrier. The Dodgers promptly outrighted him to the minor leagues, where he made 3 appearances for Class A Rancho Cucamonga and 2 for AA Chattanooga. The Dodgers recalled him to the Majors on July 23. In 21 appearances for the Dodgers he had an ERA of 2.53.

Miami Marlins
On February 6, 2014, Marmol agreed to a one-year contract with the Miami Marlins worth $1.25 million. In 15 appearances, he recorded an 8.10 ERA in  innings, while striking out 14 batters and walking 10. He was designated for assignment on May 11, 2014. On May 19, the Marlins officially released Marmol.

Cincinnati Reds
On May 27, 2014, Mármol signed a minor league deal with the Cincinnati Reds. He was released on November 17, 2014, after only pitching in 3 games in Louisville.

Cleveland Indians
On May 8, 2015, Mármol signed a minor league contract with the Cleveland Indians.

Boston Red Sox
On February 16, 2016, Mármol signed a minor league contract with the Boston Red Sox, with an invitation to spring training. On March 28, 2016, Mármol was released by the Red Sox.

International career
He has played in the World Baseball Classic for the Dominican Republic.

Pitching style

Mármol is known for two quality pitches, a four-seam fastball (91–94 mph, although when he was younger this was often several mph faster), and a sweeping slider (81–84). When Mármol pitched well, he became nearly unhittable, as evidenced by career rates of 5.7 hits and 11.7 strikeouts per 9 innings. However, Mármol has also at times been plagued by serious control problems. In 2009, he was third in the entire National League in hit batsmen (12) despite only pitching 74 innings. He had also walked more batters than he has allowed hits in his career. Mármol's control issues and an over-reliance on his slider — despite manager Dale Sveum's advice to throw his fastball more often — led to Sveum removing him from the closer role in May 2012.

References

External links

1982 births
Living people
Arizona League Cubs players
Chattanooga Lookouts players
Chicago Cubs players
Columbus Clippers players
Daytona Cubs players
Dominican Republic expatriate baseball players in the United States
Iowa Cubs players
Lansing Lugnuts players

Los Angeles Dodgers players
Louisville Bats players
Major League Baseball pitchers
Major League Baseball players from the Dominican Republic
Miami Marlins players
National League All-Stars
People from Bonao
Rancho Cucamonga Quakes players
Tigres del Licey players
West Tennessee Diamond Jaxx players
World Baseball Classic players of the Dominican Republic
2009 World Baseball Classic players